The men's 200 metres T64 event at the 2020 Summer Paralympics in Tokyo, took place on 4 September 2021.

Records
Prior to the competition, the existing records were as follows:

Results

Heats
Heat 1 took place on 4 September 2021, at 11:28:

Heat 2 took place on 4 September 2021, at 11:34:

Final
The final took place on 4 September 2021, at 20:15:

References

Men's 200 metres T64
2021 in men's athletics